This list of Caribbean countries and dependent territories is sorted by the mid-year normalized demographic projections.

Table

See also
List of Caribbean islands by area
List of Caribbean islands by political affiliation
List of metropolitan areas in the West Indies
List of West Indian first-level country subdivisions

Society of the Caribbean

Demographics of the Caribbean
Demographics of North America
Lists of countries by large sub or trans-continental region, by population
Lists of countries in the Americas
Lists of countries by population
Caribbean
Americas